Baba Ayur (also Romanized as Bāba Ayūr; also known as ‘Ayūr, Bāba Aiyūr, Bābā Alīvar, Bābā Ayūr, Bābā Ayyūr, and Bovāyūr) is a village in Siyakh Darengun Rural District, in the Central District of Shiraz County, Fars Province, Iran. According to the 2006 census, its population was 371, in 85 families.

References 

Populated places in Shiraz County